Glenn Ayr or Glenn Ayre is an unincorporated community in central Lost Creek Township, Vigo County, in the U.S. state of Indiana.

It is part of the Terre Haute metropolitan area.

History
Glenn Ayr had its start as a mining community, and was named after the Glen Ayr Coal Company. A post office was established under the name Glenn in 1887, and remained in operation until it was discontinued in 1902.

Geography

References

Unincorporated communities in Indiana
Unincorporated communities in Vigo County, Indiana
Terre Haute metropolitan area